Hansi Assembly constituency in Hisar district is one of the 90 Vidhan Sabha constituencies of Haryana state in northern India.
It is part of Hisar Lok Sabha constituency.

Members of the Legislative Assembly

See also
 Haryana Legislative Assembly
 Elections in Haryana

References

External links
 Chief Election Officer, Haryana
Official website
Map of Haryana Assembly constituencies, created by Haryana Space Applications Centre, Hisar

Assembly constituencies of Haryana
Hisar district